Greenmail or greenmailing is the action of purchasing enough shares in a firm to challenge a firm's leadership with the threat of a hostile takeover to force the target company to buy the purchased shares back at a premium in order to prevent the potential takeover.

The term is a financial neologism, coined in the 1980s, from blackmail and greenback as commentators and journalists saw the practice of corporate raiders as attempts by well-financed individuals, or their operating companies, to blackmail a company into handing over money by using the threat of a takeover.

The greenmail strategy has evolved since its first practices with ways to counter greenmail, other variations of greenmail, as well as ways to reinforce a greenmail tactic. 
In the area of mergers and acquisitions, the greenmail payment is made in an attempt to stop the hostile takeover.

Tactic
Corporate raids occasionally aim to generate large amounts of money by hostile takeovers of large, often undervalued or inefficient (i.e. non-profit-maximizing) companies, by either asset stripping and/or replacing management and employees. In other circumstances, the greenmailer seeks out assets the target company has built up as equity, such as real estate, and attempts to have the target company dispose of those assets and lease them back via a recurring lease payment, while returning the sold-off real estate to shareholders as a special dividend.

One example of this practice was the attempted takeover by William Ackman's Pershing Square Capital Management of American retailer Target, which had a large inventory of mature or nearly mature real estate properties in its corporate portfolio. Ackman attempted to have these assets spun off as an IPO, along with a partial sale of Target's credit card unit and the execution of share buybacks, which reduce the number of shares outstanding by using corporate equity and earnings to repurchase existing shareholders' positions.

Once having secured a large share of a target company, instead of completing the hostile takeover, the greenmailer offers to end the threat to the victim company by selling his share back to it, but at a substantial premium to the fair market stock price.

From the viewpoint of the target, the ransom payment may be referred to as a goodbye kiss. The origin of the term goodbye kiss as a business metaphor is unclear. In reference to a President, Chairman, or CEO in charge of a target company being taken over, there are many situations in which a golden parachute is provided. A company which agrees to buy back the bidder's stockholding in the target avoids being taken over. In return, the bidder agrees to momentarily abandon the takeover attempt and may sign a confidential agreement with the greenmailee, guaranteeing not to resume the maneuver for a period of time.

While benefiting the corporate raider, the company and the company's shareholders lose money. Greenmail also momentarily protects the company's existing management and employees from termination, demotion, or reduction in wages, which would have most certainly seen their ranks reduced or eliminated had the hostile takeover successfully gone through.

Examples
Greenmail proved lucrative for investors such as T. Boone Pickens and Sir James Goldsmith during the 1980s. In the latter example, Goldsmith made $90 million from the Goodyear Tire and Rubber Company in the 1980s in this manner. In 1984, Occidental Petroleum paid $194 million greenmail to David Murdock.

The St. Regis Paper Company provides an example of greenmail. When an investor group led by Sir James Goldsmith acquired 8.6% stake in St. Regis and expressed interest in taking over the paper concern, the company agreed to repurchase the shares at a premium. Goldsmith's group acquired the shares for an average price of $35.50 per share, a total of $109 million. It sold its stake at $52 per share, netting a profit of $51 million. Shortly after the payoff in March 1984, St. Regis became the target of publisher Rupert Murdoch. St Regis turned to Champion International and agreed to a $1.84 billion takeover. Murdoch tendered his 5.6% stake in St. Regis to the Champion offer for a profit. 

In a fictional context, greenmail tactics are prominently used in the 1987 film Wall Street. At one point, fellow corporate raider Sir Larry Wildman refers to Gordon Gekko as "a two-bit pirate and a greenmailer."

Cases
Viacom Int'l, Inc. v. Icahn, 747 F. Supp. 205 (S.D.N.Y. 1990)
Polk v. Good, 507 A.2d 531 (Del. 1986).

In 2003, Michael Ashcroft was criticised by the High Court judge, Mr Justice Peter Smith in Rock (Nominees) Ltd v RCO (Holdings) Plc. Smith condemned Ashcroft's tactics in relation to the takeover of cleaning company RCO by the Danish firm ISS. Smith said,

History
Greenmail's use, as a strategy, is one of many corporate finance tactics. The most cited 20th century legal precedents of stock manipulation, which set the foundation for tactics like Greenmail, were:

Cases
United States v. Charnay, 537 F.2d 341 (1976) Legal Precedent
The United States v. Charnay, 577 F.2d 81 (1978) Legal Precedent
United States v. Wolfson, 405 F.2d 779 (2d Cir.1968) illegal, Conviction
Gilette and Revlon
New World and Four Star

Significant pre-20th century precedents of stock manipulation, which set the foundation for tactics like Greenmail, were:

Historic Examples
Grant and Ward
J.P. Morgan
William Vanderbilt
William Duer

Prevention tactics
Greenmail is a financially sophisticated corporate business tactic, and many counter-tactics have been applied to defend against and to financially engineer the reception of a greenmail. There is a legal requirement in some jurisdictions for companies to impose limits for launching formal bids. United States Federal tax treatment of greenmail gains (a 50% excise tax), legal restrictions, as well as counter-tactics have all made greenmail far less common since the early 1990s (see 26 U.S.C. § 5881, and 26 C.F.R. Part 156, notably § 156.5881-1 ff.).

See also 
Insider trading
Watered stock
Stock dilution
Pump and dump
Stock bashing

Notes

References
David Manry & David Stangeland, 'Greenmail: A Brief History' (2001) 6 Stanford Journal of Law, Business and Finance 217  (not free)

External links
 Dawn Raid at Investopedia

Mergers and acquisitions
Corporate finance